Kalanchoe beharensis (commonly known as elephant's ear kalanchoe, felt bush, or feltbush) is a plant species in the succulent genus Kalanchoe, and the family Crassulaceae. Kalanchoe beharensis is native to Madagascar known by local names mongy, rongy and tavitavy.

Plant structure
Leaves are olive green, triangular-lanceolate shaped, decussately arranged (pairs at right-angles to each other) with leaf margins that are doubly crenate (crinkled). The bottoms of the leaves are glabrous (smooth and glossy), and covered with a woolly hair towards the apex. The leaf hairs are brown, and the tips of the teeth are darker. The hairs on the stem, younger leaves, and petioles (leaf stalks) are white. A sign of older leaves is concavity on the upper surface. Flowers are on short pedicels (stalks). The calyx is 7 mm long with lobes that are oblong and acuminate (tapering to a point). The corolla tube is urn-shaped and 7 mm long. Blooming occurs from spring to summer, and flowers are small and yellowish.

The types of trichome present on the leaves of Kalanchoe vary among the different species.  The different types of trichomes are an indicator of adaptation to a particular environment.  On the leaf blade of K. beharensis there are trichomes of the non-glandular, bushy three-branched type. This type of trichome is dead, with evidence of tannin. K. beharensis trichomes are also characterized by striped cuticular ornamentation on their surface.  Glandular trichomes are also present on the leaves, with more on petioles than on leaf blades, and more on the top of the leaf as opposed to the bottom.

Reproduction
The genus Kalanchoe may reproduce asexually by producing plantlets on leaf margins, which when distributed on a suitable substrate will form new plants.  Plantlet-forming species fall under two categories. The first category is induced plantlet-forming species that produce plantlets under stress.  The second plantlet-forming species is constitutive plantlet-forming species that spontaneously forms plantlets. Induced plantlet-forming species have the LEC1 gene that allows them to produce seeds, whereas the constitutive plantlet-forming species have a defective LEC1 gene and cannot produce seeds. K. beharensis produces seeds as well as plantlets.

Defense system
Kalanchoe beharensis uses a system of defense, not unique to this plant, termed stress-limited defence.  This system involves deterring herbivores (plant eating creatures) before a high stress level ensues causing cracking in the tissue of the plant. High hardness, a structural component of this system, is characterized by tissues with high density.  Since the tissues of plants employing this defense system have a high density, the defenses, commonly spines, prickles, thorns and hair, must reside on the surface of the plant. Amorphous silica is found in the defense structures with a microhardness of about 5000 MPa, which is higher than the microhardness of insects, and of mammalian enamel with a microhardness of 3500 MPa. Through research, this defense system is shown to decrease the amount of plant matter eaten by vertebrate herbivores by reducing the size of the bite a herbivore takes, the volume of a bite, or the rate at which biting occurs.

Carbon fixation
The first field study of crassulacean acid metabolism, a type of carbon fixation, has been done on Kalanchoe beharensis ‘Drake del Castillo’, in a paper by Kluge et al. entitled "In situ studies of crassulacean acid metabolism in Kalanchoe beharensis Drake Del Castillo, a plant of the semi-arid southern region of Madagascar."  The study includes information on diel patterns of CO2 exchange and transpiration. It also includes measurements of fluctuations in organic acid levels, PEP carboxylase properties and water relations.  Some conclusions of this study are that Kalanchoe beharensis advantageously performs CAM fully during the entire arid seasons, avoiding CAM idling. It can do this because of its ability to maintain the correct water balance in its leaves, even in periods of drought.

Cultivation
It may be grown as a houseplant or outdoors in mostly frost-free landscapes and is not toxic to dogs if it has not been treated with any chemicals (according to the National Animal Poison Information network). This plant needs full to partial sun, with intermediate to warm temperatures above .  It will survive frost on a scale from light to moderate. For growth in a greenhouse K. beharensis will grow in a mixture of equally distributed loam and sand, and gravel for drainage. The plant should be dry before watering again, as too much water will kill it. Watering should occur every 14–20 days during the growing season. In the winter months it should be watered sparingly. The species is resilient and will survive if neglected.

Propagation is by seed, stem cuttings, or by leaf cuttings, in which the mid rib should be cut in various places.  The cuttings should be grown on a sandy substrate. In many instances, numerous varieties of Kalanchoe will not only root from freshly pruned leaves, they will form new baby plantlets right from the very center of the removed leaf.

The species and the cultivar 'Fang' have gained the Royal Horticultural Society's Award of Garden Merit. Fang was hybridized originally by crossing K. beharensis with K. tomentosa.

Gallery

References

beharensis